Julia Collins may refer to:

People
Julia C. Collins (c. 1842–1965), African-American writer
Julia Collins (Jeopardy! contestant) (born 1982), American game show contestant

Characters
Julia Collins, a fictional character from the 1947 U.S. western film Under Colorado Skies
Julia Collins, a fictional character from the 1960s U.S. ABC TV show Dark Shadows
Julia Collins, a fictional character from "Tangled Hearts" in 1970s UK BBC TV show Wodehouse Playhouse

See also
 Collins (disambiguation)
 Julia (disambiguation)